The 2017 Copa do Nordeste was the 14th edition of the main football tournament featuring teams from the Brazilian Northeast Region. The competition featured 20 clubs, with Bahia and Pernambuco having three seeds each, and Ceará, Rio Grande do Norte, Sergipe, Alagoas, Paraíba, Maranhão and Piauí with two seeds each.

Bahia defeated Sport 2–1 on aggregate to win their third Copa do Nordeste title. After the format changes implemented by CONMEBOL, Bahia did not qualify to Copa Sudamericana. Instead, they had a berth in the Round of 16 of the 2018 Copa do Brasil.

Santa Cruz were the defending champions, but were eliminated by Sport in the semi-finals.

Qualified teams

Format
In the Group stage, each group was played on a home-and-away round-robin basis. The winners and the top three runners-up of each group advanced to the Quarter-finals.
In the final stages, the 8 teams played a single-elimination tournament. Each tie was played on a home-and-away two-legged basis, with the best tournament team hosting the second leg. If tied on aggregate, the away goals rule would be used. If still tied, extra time would not be played, and the penalty shoot-out would be used to determine the winner.

Tiebreakers
The teams were ranked according to points (3 points for a win, 1 point for a draw, 0 points for a loss).
To select the top four group winners and the top three runners-up.
If two or more teams were equal on points, the following criteria were applied to determine the rankings:
Higher number of wins;
Superior goal difference;
Higher number of goals scored;
Draw in the headquarters of the Brazilian Football Confederation.

To rank same group teams.
If two or more teams were equal on points on completion of the group matches, the following criteria were applied to determine the rankings:
Higher number of wins;
Superior goal difference;
Higher number of goals scored;
Head-to-head result between tied teams (only applicable for a 2 teams tiebreak). If tied on aggregate, the away goals rule would be used unless the teams play in the same stadium;
Fewest red cards received;
Fewest yellow cards received;
Draw in the headquarters of the Brazilian Football Confederation.

To select Semi-finals and Final second leg host team
If two or more teams were equal on points, the following criteria were applied to determine the host team:
Higher number of wins in the tournament;
Superior goal difference in the tournament;
Draw in the headquarters of the Brazilian Football Confederation.

Group stage

Group A

Group B

Group C

Group D

Group E

Top three runners-up

Knockout phase
A draw by CBF was held on March 24 to set the matches for the Quarter-finals. The 8 qualified teams were divided in two pots (1-2). Teams from pot 1 were the top four group winners. Pot 2 was composed of the other group winner and the top three runners-up.

Seeding

Bracket

Quarter-finals
The first legs were played on 29 and 30 March, and the second legs were played on 1 and 2 April 2017.

|}

Matches

Tied 4–4 on aggregate, Sport won on penalties and advanced to the semi-finals.

Santa Cruz won 2–0 on aggregate and advanced to the semi-finals.

Vitória won 4–2 on aggregate and advanced to the semi-finals.

Bahia won 7–2 on aggregate and advanced to the semi-finals.

Semi-finals

Host team

Summary
The first legs were played on 27 and 29 April, and the second legs were played on 30 April and 3 May 2017.

|}

Matches

Sport won 3–2 on aggregate and advanced to the final.

Bahia won 3–2 on aggregate and advanced to the final.

Final

Host team

Summary

|}

Matches

Top scorers

2017 Copa do Nordeste team
The 2017 Copa do Nordeste team was a squad consisting of the eleven most impressive players at the tournament.

||

References

2017 domestic association football cups
Copa do Nordeste
2017 in Brazilian football leagues